The Tachikawa Ki-92 was an experimental Japanese heavy transport aircraft of World War II.
It was a low-wing monoplane with a pressurized fuselage, twin piston engines and a tailwheel undercarriage.

Development
In March 1942 the Imperial Japanese Army Air Service chose Tachikawa Aircraft Company to design and build a new heavy twin engine transport aircraft with a focus on increased range, power and speed to carry light tanks, field artillery and troops.

Shinjiro Shinagawa was in charge of the development and began work in March 1943 and had the first prototype completed by September 1944. Like Tachikawa's Ki-77 the aircraft featured a laminar flow airfoil. The Ki-92 also had a sealed cabin with double glazed windows seating 34 troops in 4 rows (including two emergency seats) to reduce the need for oxygen, and forced draught cooling in low drag engine nacelles. Due to various repairs and modifications, the first flight did not occur until April 1945. The test flight recorded a maximum speed of 426 km/h, but the Ki-92 was found to be dangerous to fly with the cargo door open at these speeds even though fuselage rigidity was not a problem. 

Due to the deteriorating war situation and resulting reduction in priority for transport aircraft, of the three to 10 prototypes planned for, only one prototype and no production aircraft were built before the war ended. Orders included 114 constructed extensively from wood to conserve aluminium, though the Ki-92 prototype already featured a tail made from wood. Tachikawa had planned for their potential use as commercial transports during the design phase.

Allied intelligence organizations such as ATAIU SEA were unaware of the existence of the Ki-92 and did not assign a code name to it.

Operators 

Imperial Japanese Army Air Service (Evaluation only)

Specifications (Tachikawa Ki-92)

See also

References

Citations

Bibliography

 (Japanese)

 (Czech)

1940s Japanese experimental aircraft
Ki-92
Low-wing aircraft
1940s Japanese military transport aircraft
Aircraft first flown in 1945
Twin piston-engined tractor aircraft